Thomas Gay (fl. 1378–1390) was an English politician.

He was a Member (MP) of the Parliament of England for Chippenham from 1378 to 1390.

References

Year of birth missing
Year of death missing
English MPs 1378
English MPs May 1382
English MPs October 1383
English MPs April 1384
English MPs November 1384
English MPs 1386
English MPs February 1388
English MPs September 1388
English MPs January 1390
Members of the Parliament of England for Chippenham